Robert Steven Nelsen (born January 21, 1952) is an American academic administrator, currently serving as the eighth President of California State University, Sacramento since July 1, 2015.

On November 2, 2022, Nelsen announced his impending retirement as President of California State University, Sacramento and the CSU Board of Trustees subsequently announced their search for the ninth President of the University by the  Trustees Committee for the Selection of the President chaired by Diego Arambula.

Early life and education 
Nelsen was born in Brigham City, Utah and raised in Madison County, Montana. He earned a bachelor 1978 and master's degree in political science 1979 from Brigham Young University and a Ph.D from the University of Chicago 1989, specializing in modern literature, modern philosophy, and modern political theory.

Career 
Prior to becoming president of CSUS, he was serving as special adviser to the University of Texas System's Executive Vice Chancellor for Academic Affairs. Nelsen served as the eighth President of the University of Texas–Pan American from January 2010 to August 2014.

Prior to this, Nelsen was an associate vice president for academic affairs and professor of English at Texas A&M University–Corpus Christi.

Earlier, Nelsen was a faculty member at the University of Texas at Dallas. He served as the speaker of the Faculty and chaired the University of Texas System Faculty Advisory Council. After winning the Chancellor’s Council Award for Outstanding Teaching, he was recruited into the Provost's Office and served as vice provost there.

Nelsen is an author of fiction in journals which include the Story Quarterly, Other Voices, Chariton Review, and Southwest Review.

Honors and awards 
 Pushcart Prize, Best of the Small Presses: Distinguished Stories Award, 1991: "Ronnie Big Wolf Tooth" and "Two Points of a Blue Star", 1991
 "Ten Best Journals," Common Knowledge, May 1, 1993, Library Journal
 "Best Journal in Humanities, Social Studies, and Social Sciences, 1993," Common Knowledge, The Association of American Publishers, January 1994
 Literacy Champion Award, South Texas Literacy Coalition, Historias de la Vida 3rd Annual Gala, Palmhurst, Texas, September 24, 2011
 Community Literacy Champion, South Texas Literacy Coalition, Edinburg, Texas, September 22, 2012
 Edinburg Rotary Leadership Award, Edinburg, Texas, June 26, 2013
 Good Samaritan Community Services Award, Good Samaritan Community Services, Pharr, Texas, August 7, 2013
 Man of the Year Award, Edinburg Chamber of Commerce, Edinburg, Texas, Texas, October 24, 2013
 Golden Eagle Award, Rio Grande Valley Hispanic Chamber of Commerce, McAllen, Texas, March 1, 2014
 Rio Grande Valley Walk of Fame, BorderFest, Hidalgo, Texas, March 5, 2014
 Champion of the Year, Sacramento Black Chamber of Commerce 2022

References

External links 
 Official University of Texas-Pan American Profile
 Special Tribute to Dr. Robert Nelsen

Presidents of California State University, Sacramento
1952 births
Living people
University of Illinois Chicago faculty
University of Texas at Dallas faculty
University of Texas System people
Brigham Young University alumni
Texas A&M University–Corpus Christi faculty
University of Chicago alumni
People from Brigham City, Utah
People from McAllen, Texas
20th-century American educators
21st-century American educators